Indian Vampire (Italian:La vampira Indiana) is a 1913 Italian silent Western film directed by Roberto Roberti and starring Bice Valerian.

Cast
 Antonietta Calderari 
 Frederico Elvezi 
 Antonio Greco (credited as Signor Greco) 
 Giovanni Pezzinga 
 Roberto Roberti 
 Angiolina Solari 
 Bice Valerian

References

Bibliography
 Brunetta, Gian Piero. The History of Italian Cinema. Princeton University Press, 2009.

External links
 

1913 films
1913 Western (genre) films
Films directed by Roberto Roberti
Italian Western (genre) films
Italian black-and-white films
Italian silent feature films
1910s Italian-language films
Silent Western (genre) films